The 1988 Phoenix Cardinals season was the franchise's 69th season in the National Football League and the first season in Phoenix. The Cardinals would match their 7–8 record from 1987, but finished with one more loss, going 7–9, as 1987 was a one-game strike shortened season, and 1988 was a full 16 game season. The Cardinals move to Phoenix marked the first time an NFL team called a place in Arizona home.

Offseason

NFL Draft

Personnel

Staff

Roster

Regular season

Schedule

Standings

Season summary

Week 2 vs Cowboys

References

External links 
 1988 Phoenix Cardinals at Pro-Football-Reference.com

Phoenix
Arizona Cardinals seasons
Arizona Card